Wooli Wooli River, an open and trained mature wave dominated, barrier estuary, is located in the Northern Rivers region of New South Wales, Australia.

Course and features
Wooli Wooli River rises on the eastern slopes of the Coastal Range within the Newfoundland State Forest and northwest of Red Rock, and flows generally north, east, and then south, before reaching its mouth at the Coral Sea of the South Pacific Ocean south of Wooli; descending  over its  course.

See also

 Rivers of New South Wales
 Rivers in Australia

References

External links
 

 

Rivers of New South Wales
Northern Rivers